Squirtgun is the eponymously titled debut studio album by the American punk rock band Squirtgun. It was released on October 9, 1995, through Lookout! Records. The song "Social" was used during the opening credits of the Kevin Smith film Mallrats (1995). "Make It Up" features a guest appearance by Mike Dirnt of Green Day on bass and backing vocals.

Track listing
"Long So Long" (Mass Giorgini, Matt Hart) - 2:00
"Elaine on the Brain" (Flav Giorgini, Hart) - 1:50
"Allergic to You" (M. Giorgini, Hart) - 2:15
"Mr. Orange" (F. Giorgini, Hart) - 2:03
"Liar's Corner" (Hart) - 1:37
"Social" (Hart) - 3:52
"With a Grin and a Kick" (Hart) - 2:31
"Morning Grit" (F. Giorgini) - 1:14
"Less Than Nothing" (F. Giorgini) - 2:30
"Make It Up" (F. Giorgini) - 2:02
"Headache All Day" (M. Giorgini, Hart) - 2:06
"Frederick's Frost" (M. Giorgini, Hart) - 1:40

Personnel
 Mass Giorgini - bass, producer
 Flav Giorgini - guitar
 Matt Hart - guitar, vocals
 Dan Lumley - drums
 Mike Dirnt - bass and backing vocals on track 10

References

1995 debut albums
Squirtgun albums
Lookout! Records albums